The Delta Fire was a wildfire that burned near Lakehead, California, in the Shasta National Forest. The fire burned  and destroyed 20 structures, before it was 100% contained on October 7, 2018. The fire burned into the western flank of the nearby Hirz Fire on September 10, and also burned only a couple of miles away from the enormous Carr Fire, the seventh-most destructive fire in Californian history.

Timeline
The Delta Fire ignited on September 5, 2018, at approximately 12:51 PM PDT, 2 miles north of Lakehead, California. The fire rapidly grew in size, crossing over Interstate 5 between Lakehead, California, and Castella, California, which forced the interstate to be shut down from September 5 to September 10. On September 10, the fire merged with the nearby Hirz Fire to the east, and by September 11, the fire was only a few miles away from burning into the already-contained Carr Fire to the southwest. On September 12, the Delta Fire reached  and was only 17% contained. On September 13, the northern flank of the fire flared up again and shut down Interstate 5 again for six hours during the afternoon. During the next few days, the Delta Fire continued to grow in size, albeit at a slow rate, while firefighters continued making progress on containing the wildfire, with the fire reaching  and 76% containment by September 17. On September 18, firefighters had contained most of the Delta Fire's northern flank, while flames on the fire's southwestern flank continued to spread, nearly reaching the Carr Fire's burn area. On September 25, a spot fire broke out in Bear Gulch, outside of the southwestern perimeter of the Delta Fire, which quickly reached  by the next morning. The spot fires were at 0% containment. The fire did not experience any further growths for the next several days, while containment generally remained at 97% up until October 5. On October 7, the Delta Fire was fully contained, without any further increases in size.

The fire was determined to be man-made, although the exact cause remains unclear. On May 5, 2021, Shasta County District Attorney, Stephanie A. Bridgett announced that Cynthia Ann LeRoux has been arrested and faces charges for starting the Delta Fire

Fire growth and containment progress

See also 
2018 California wildfires
Carr Fire
Hirz Fire

References

External links
 Record Searchlight Delta Fire Updates
 ArcGIS Delta Fire Activity Map
 InciWeb Delta Fire Map
 Cal OES Delta Fire Live Map

2018 California wildfires
Wildfires in Shasta County, California
Articles containing video clips